The University of Florida Levin College of Law Journal of Law & Public Policy is a quarterly law review published by the University of Florida's Fredric G. Levin College of Law, and is the only interdisciplinary journal at the law school. The journal was founded by Florida's First District Court of Appeals Judge Scott Makar in 1987, and is run by sixty student members and one staff assistant, with the aid of a faculty advisor. The journal publishes articles, essays, and lectures.

Notable articles 
Scott Matheson Jr., "Constitutional Status and Role of the Attorney General", 6 U. Fla. J.L. & Pub. Pol'y 1 (1993)

References

External links 
 

American law journals
University of Florida
Publications established in 1987
Bimonthly journals
English-language journals
1987 establishments in Florida
Law journals edited by students
Law and public policy journals